Cardiopteris is a genus of vines in the family Cardiopteridaceae described as a genus in 1834.

Cardiopteris is native to Southeast Asia, the Himalayas, and New Guinea.

Species
 Cardiopteris moluccana Blume - Philippines, Maluku, Sulawesi, New Guinea, Bismarck Archipelago 
 Cardiopteris quinqueloba (Hassk.) Hassk. - Yunnan, Assam, Bhutan, Bangladesh, Indochina, Malaysia, Indonesia

References

External links
photo of herbarium specimen at Missouri Botanical Garden, collected in Cambodia, Cardiopteris quinqueloba

Cardiopteridaceae
Asterid genera